Qirq Maghar, also spelled Qirqmaghar or Qarah Mughar, is a village located  south of Jarabulus in northern Syria.

References

Villages in Aleppo Governorate
Populated places in Jarabulus District